Bay Area Christian School (BACS) is a Christian K-12 school in League City, Texas in Greater Houston. It is a ministry of the Bay Area First Baptist Church.

History
The First Baptist Christian School of League City opened in 1973. In 1978 it had 230 students, an increase from its previous figures. In 1985 the school received its current name.

Beginning in 1992 the school began to use waiting lists for enrollment. In 1995 the current gymnasium and field house were completed. In 2005 the current elementary school building opened. In 2009 the school had over 700 students. In 2010 the current high school building opened.

On January 26, 2011, the school's 6th grade and junior high school teams competed in the Lutheran High North Academic Quest, an annual academic competition between area private schools. They won seven grade-level and 29 academic achievement awards. The school received the first place placement in its division.

Demographics
As of 2015 it has 785 students, including 472 in grades K-6 and 313 in grades 7-12. Students originate from several communities including League City, Alvin, Clear Lake, Dickinson, Friendswood, and southern Houston.

References

1973 establishments in Texas
Baptist schools in the United States
Educational institutions established in 1973
Private K-12 schools in Texas
High schools in Galveston County, Texas
Christian schools in Texas
League City, Texas